Lynda Louise Day George (born December 11, 1944) is an American television and film actress whose career spanned three decades from the 1960s to the 1980s. She was a cast member on Mission: Impossible (1971–1973).  She was also the wife of actor Christopher George.

Life and career
George was born in San Marcos, Texas. Originally known as Lynda Day, she began her career in the 1960s with the Eileen Ford modeling agency working as a top model in print and TV commercials, and then on Broadway starring in The Devils opposite Jason Robards and Anne Bancroft. She then moved to Los Angeles and began a long television career with guest roles on many series of the 1960s, including Route 66, Flipper, Here Come the Brides, The Green Hornet, Mannix, The Fugitive, The Invaders, It Takes a Thief, Star Trek, The Virginian, Good Morning World, Lancer and Bonanza. She starred in the first of the two Universal/NBC TV-pilot films based around psychiatrist/supernatural investigator Dr. David Sorrell (played by Louis Jourdan), Fear No Evil in 1969. George also had appearances playing in Barnaby Jones in the 1973 episode “Stand in for Death” and in a 1975 episode “Double Vengeance”. She had her first major role as Amelia Cole in a short-lived 1970–1971 television series, The Silent Force, and later starred in the television pilot for Cannon in 1971. That same year, she was cast as Lisa Casey in the critically acclaimed series Mission: Impossible, garnering a Golden Globe nomination in 1972 and an Emmy Award nomination in 1973. During the show's last season, she missed seven episodes because of her maternity leave and was temporarily replaced by Barbara Anderson.

She first met actor Christopher George while they were both models at Eileen Ford and she was married to her first husband. They starred together in the 1966 independent film The Gentle Rain. While working together again in the 1970 John Wayne film Chisum, they fell in love and were married on May 15, 1970. 

Thereafter, she became Lynda Day George and co-starred in multiple television films with her husband over the next 10 years, including The House on Greenapple Road (1970), Mayday at 40,000 Feet! (1976), and Cruise Into Terror (1978). They also worked together in episodes of The F.B.I. (1970), Mission: Impossible (1971), McCloud (1975), Love Boat (1977), and Vega$ (1978). They guest-starred in television's Wonder Woman in 1976, with Lynda playing villain Fausta Grables, the Nazi Wonder Woman.

She continued her television work throughout the 1970s with guest roles on Police Story; Kung Fu; Marcus Welby, M.D.; and Barnaby Jones. She played supporting roles in Rich Man, Poor Man; Roots; and Once an Eagle.  In 1977, she appeared on the game shows Match Game '77 and Tattletales, the latter with her husband Christopher.

Her movie career is noted for several horror cult films in which she co-starred with her husband Christopher, including Day of the Animals (1977), Pieces (1982), and Mortuary (1983). She also co-starred with John Saxon in the 1980 horror film Beyond Evil.

Christopher George died of a heart attack on November 28, 1983, at the age of 52. She only worked sporadically after that, in guest roles on Fantasy Island (appearing several times on the series, playing a different character each time), Murder She Wrote, Hardcastle and McCormick, and Blacke's Magic. She was also a regular guest on various religious television programs. In one of her final performances, Lynda reprised the role of Lisa Casey on an episode of the revived Mission: Impossible television series in 1989.

In 2021, George announced that she is ready to return to acting.

Marriages
She was first married to Joseph Pantano from 1963 to 1970, with one son, Nicky. She left Pantano to marry Christopher George. She was married to him from May 15, 1970, until his death on November 28, 1983, and they had one daughter, Casey. They filed suit to have Nicky Pantano legally declared as Christopher's natural son. In 1990, Lynda George's third marriage was with actor and producer Doug Cronin, who died of cancer on December 4, 2010; they resided in Los Angeles and Gardiner, Washington.

Memoir
On January 17, 2020, during an interview with entertainment correspondent Ed Robertson of TV Confidential, George announced that she was collaborating with a biographer on a memoir centered on her acting career. The working title is Lynda Day George: A Hollywood Memoir.

Filmography

Awards and nominations

References

External links
 
 The Girls of Mission: Impossible
 Love is actress' beauty secret: Retired TV star Lynda Day George happy in Gardiner

1944 births
Actresses from Texas
American film actresses
American television actresses
Living people
People from San Marcos, Texas
20th-century American actresses
21st-century American women